Oliver Lund Jensen (born 21 August 1990) is a Danish professional footballer who plays as a full-back for Danish Superliga club AGF

Club career

Vestsjælland
He played his first game in the Danish Superliga, and got his debut for FCV against Brøndby IF the 21 July 2013, the game ended 1-1.

OB
On 22 June 2015 it was confirmed, that Lund signed OB on a 2-year contract. He left the club in the summer 2017, as his contract expired.

Lyngby
Lund signed for Lyngby Boldklub on 27 June 2017.

Return to OB
On 25 January 2019, Lund re-joined Odense Boldklub on a one-and-a-half-year contract.

AGF
On 16 June 2021, Lund joined AGF on a one-year contract.

References

External links
 

Living people
1990 births
Danish men's footballers
Danish Superliga players
FC Vestsjælland players
Akademisk Boldklub players
Odense Boldklub players
Lyngby Boldklub players
Aarhus Gymnastikforening players
Association football defenders
Herlev IF players